

Group A









Group B









Group C









Group D









References

External links
 FIBA Archive

EuroBasket Women 2009
EuroBasket Women squads